Blood and Roses is a 1960 erotic horror film directed by Roger Vadim. It is based on the novella Carmilla (1872) by Irish writer Sheridan Le Fanu, shifting the book's setting in 19th-century Styria to the film's 20th-century Italy.

Plot

Set in the modern day at a European estate, Carmilla is torn emotionally by the engagement of her friend Georgia to her cousin Leopoldo. It is hard to tell for whom she has the strongest unrequited emotions. During the masquerade ball celebrating the upcoming marriage, a fireworks display accidentally explodes some munitions lost at the site in World War II, disturbing an ancestral catacomb. Carmilla wearing the dress of her legendary vampire ancestor wanders into the ruins, where the tomb of the ancestor opens slowly. Carmilla returns to Leopoldo's estate as the last guests depart. Over the next few days she proceeds to act as though possessed by the spirit of the vampire and a series of vampiric killings terrorize the estate.

Cast
Mel Ferrer as Leopoldo De Karnstein
Elsa Martinelli as Georgia Monteverdi
Annette Vadim as Carmilla
René-Jean Chauffard as Dr. Verari
Marc Allégret as Judge Monteverdi
Alberto Bonucci as Carlo Ruggieri
Serge Marquand as Giuseppe
Gabriella Farinon as Lisa
Renato Speziali as  Guido Naldi
Edith Peters as The Cook
Giovanni Di Benedetto as Police Marshal
Carmilla Stroyberg as Martha
Nathalie LeForet as Marie

Production
Blood and Roses was filmed at Hadrian's Villa in Italy.

Release
Blood and Roses was released in France on 14 September 1960. It was released in Rome in January 1961 under the title Il sangue e la rosa. It was also released in the United States in September 1961.

Thus far the only DVD of Blood and Roses is a German one with German language and French with English subtitles options.

Reception
In a contemporary review Monthly Film Bulletin noted that "despite the elegance and beauty of the backgrounds in and about Hadrian's Villa" and "Claude Renoir's Tehnicolor-Technicrama photography, this expensive attempt at an art horror film is nothing short of a travesty-both of the genre and LeFanu's marvellous short story." The review noted that the film was "awkward and pedantic" and that the "vampire story is ruined by leaden dialogue, stridently dubbed, and by the sometimes bathetic acting" and that the "film suffers badly from comparison with Dreyer's much freer adaptation of the story, Vampyr."

The March 1962 issue of the pro-gay magazine ONE noted that "We hear the latest fad for some gay girls after seeing the spook vampire movie with a lesbian lilt, Blood & Roses, is to tattoo two little marks above the jugular. Wanta neck?"

See also
 List of French films of 1960
 List of horror films of 1960
 Lesbian vampire
Vampire film

References

External links
 
 

1960 films
1960 horror films
French vampire films
French erotic films
Italian erotic horror films
Italian vampire films
Films based on works by Sheridan Le Fanu
Films directed by Roger Vadim
Films based on Irish novels
1960s French-language films
Films shot in Italy
Films set in Italy
Films set in country houses
Paramount Pictures films
1960s Italian films
1960s French films